The England national cricket team toured Pakistan in March 1984 and played a three-match Test series against the Pakistan national cricket team. Pakistan won the Test series 1–0. England were captained by Bob Willis and Pakistan by Zaheer Abbas. In addition, the teams played a two-match Limited Overs International (LOI) series which was drawn 1–1. The third Test of the series, at Lahore, was the 600th Test match to be played by England.

Test series summary

First Test

Second Test

Third Test

One Day Internationals (ODIs)

The Wills Series was drawn 1-1.

1st ODI

2nd ODI

References

1984 in English cricket
1984 in Pakistani cricket
1984
International cricket competitions from 1980–81 to 1985
Pakistani cricket seasons from 1970–71 to 1999–2000